Media Group Radio is a network of radio stations owned and operated by Media Group (Media FM, S.A. de C.V.) in the Mexican state of Michoacán. The stations carry a variety of news and talk programs during the day and musical programming in off hours.

History
Media Group won eight radio stations in Michoacán in the IFT-4 radio auction of 2017. Acustik Michoacán began internet transmissions on January 15, 2018, coinciding with the first day of the Informe Brozo, the first national radio-TV program syndicated by Grupo Acustik, with which Acustik Michoacán was affiliated. Acustik Michoacán also carries the audio of the Canal 6 TV newscasts produced by Media Group for its cable station. The FM transmissions began between April and early June 2018, followed by the Morelia AM station in June 2018 and the Uruapan station later in the year.

In late March 2019, the Acustik branding was dropped and the stations became "Media Group Radio".

Stations
Six FM and two AM radio stations carry the Media Group Radio programming.

The Apatzingán, Ciudad Hidalgo and Pátzcuaro transmitters broadcast in HD Radio.

References

External links
Media Group Radio website

Radio stations in Michoacán
Radio stations established in 2018
2018 establishments in Mexico
HD Radio stations